P36 or P-36 may refer to:

Vessels 
 , a ship of the Argentine Navy
 , a P-class sloop of the Royal Navy
 , a submarine of the Royal Navy
 , a corvette of the Indian Navy

Other uses 
 Curtiss P-36 Hawk, an American fighter aircraft
 Papyrus 36, a biblical manuscript
 Petrobras 36, a collapsed oil platform
 Phosphorus-36, an isotope of phosphorus
 Soviet locomotive class P36, a steam locomotive

See also 
 R-36 (missile), with a Cyrillic  instead of a Latin P.